Pedro L. Yap (July 1, 1918 – November 20, 2003) was the Chief Justice of the Supreme Court of the Philippines in 1988. He briefly served for two and a half months from April 19, 1988 to June 30, 1988, the shortest in history until that record was surpassed by Chief Justice Teresita de Castro.
He worked in the notable Salonga, Ordoñez, Yap & Associates Law Offices, which was named after Jovito Salonga and Justice Secretary Sedfrey Ordoñez.

References
 Cruz, Isagani A. (2000). Res Gestae: A Brief History of the Supreme Court. Rex Book Store, Manila

1918 births
2003 deaths
Chief justices of the Supreme Court of the Philippines
Associate Justices of the Supreme Court of the Philippines
20th-century Filipino judges
People from Leyte (province)
University of the Philippines alumni
Filipino politicians of Chinese descent